Bela Lugosi Meets a Brooklyn Gorilla (also known as The Boys from Brooklyn and in England as Monster Meets The Gorilla) is a 1952 American comedy horror science fiction film directed by William Beaudine and starring horror veteran Bela Lugosi with nightclub performers Duke Mitchell and Sammy Petrillo in roles approximating the then-popular duo of Martin and Lewis.

Opening narration
"This is the jungle... the vast wilderness of giant lush foliage... of tropical birds and fierce animal life... the killer tiger... the cunning hyena... the deadly python that can crush a giant elk... the proud lion... a fierce lioness, stalking a prey to feed her young... and the buzzards... the scavengers of the jungle... soaring lower, ever lower... eager to devour the dead or the dying. Kill or be killed... this is the law of the jungle... and here... what have we here? Who are these men? What can they possibly be doing in this cruel tropical wilderness?"

Plot
Jungle-dwelling natives find two long-haired bearded men dressed in frayed tuxedos asleep on the jungle floor and carry the men to their chief and his daughter who insists on protecting them. She mimes instructions that the men are to be dressed, shaven and given haircuts, all of which is done while they are still asleep. Upon waking up, the men — Duke Mitchell and Sammy Petrillo — introduce themselves to the chief's daughter Nona and recount that they were on their way "to do a show for the boys on Guam", but opened the wrong door on the plane, fell out with their parachutes and have been living on wild berries and raw fish. Nona explains that her father is Chief Rakos and "this is the most southern fringe of the Zambuanga Group — the Island of Kola Kola".

At that evening's luau, Duke establishes a closer relationship with Nona, while Sammy is introduced to Nona's overly-friendly plus-size "baby sister" Saloma, causing him to jump up, join the luau dancers and then perform a comedy routine, followed by Duke's rendition of "'Deed I Do". Afterwards, Nona tells Duke that she was educated in an American college to prepare her for ruling the island as its queen.     
When Duke inquires about leaving the island, Nona says, "perhaps Dr. Zabor can help you. He's the only white man on the island. He lives on the other side of the island. He's a scientist working on an experiment in evolution. He hired me as his assistant. Tomorrow I shall take you to him." In the meantime, Saloma continues to chase Sammy through the jungle and kisses him goodnight while Duke and Nona share a kiss.

The following morning, upon arriving at Dr. Zabor's Dracula-like castle, Nona, Duke and Sammy are let in by the tall, heavily-built native servant Chula who goes to inform Dr. Zabor. When Dr. Zabor comes out to greet them, Duke thinks he knows him and Sammy reminds Duke, "Ain't this the fellow that goes around with the hand and the faces, biting people on the neck and wearing capes?" "You're crazy", replies Duke, "Watch out for bats", shouts Sammy. Dr. Zabor offers to help Duke and Sammy leave the island and offers them the hospitality of his castle and the use of his wardrobe.

In the laboratory, Dr. Zabor insists to the reluctant Nona that "You shall love me" as Chula ushers in the re-dressed Duke and Sammy who become interested in Dr. Zabor's caged chimp Ramona. The castle is visited by the island's law representative, Pepe Bordo, who has the only "wireless outfit" and promises to communicate with a passing ship. As Dr. Zabor accompanies Pepe Bordo to the outside, Duke and Nona kiss while Ramona pulls Sammy into her cage and locks the door.

In the evening, Duke walks Nona back to her village, Dr. Zabor drinks and broods over Nona's reluctance and Sammy goes to bed alone, but Ramona opens her cage door, leaves the laboratory, goes upstairs and climbs into bed with Sammy who winds up spending the night with Ramona in her cage, while Duke returns and goes to bed.

On another evening Dr. Zabor and Chula arrive to share a meal with Chief Rakos, Nona, Saloma, Duke, Sammy and the witch doctor. As Nona and Duke go outside, Dr. Zabor sends Chula to spy on them, while Saloma encourages Sammy to go out so she can meet with him. As Chula listens, Duke proposes marriage to Nona and sings "Too Soon" to the melody of "La Paloma". Chula returns, Dr. Zabor puts on his black cape, leaves and listens to Chula describe Duke's and Nona's marriage plans. Back in the laboratory, Dr. Zabor injects Ramona, reversing evolution and turning her into a small monkey with a tail.

The following morning, as Nona returns to the laboratory, Dr. Zabor realizes that the serum's effect was only temporary and Ramona has turned back into a chimp. Meanwhile, Duke is on his way to see Pepe Bordo, but is ambushed by Chula who carries him to the laboratory where Dr. Zabor tells Nona that the day's work is done and that she should take Sammy to the village and after they leave, injects Duke with the serum and watches him turn into a gorilla.

As Nona and Sammy return to the laboratory in search of Duke, Dr. Zabor explains that the gorilla is actually Ramona advanced to a higher level of evolution. He and Nona start out for the village, leaving Sammy in the laboratory with the gorilla who uses charades in pantomiming to Sammy that he is really Duke. Sammy still cannot understand until the gorilla launches into a gravelly rendition of "'Deed I Do". Sammy unlocks the cage, the gorilla knocks out Chula who later awakens and goes to the village to warn Dr. Zabor. Zabor and Chula return to the castle to find Sammy and the gorilla running away, pursued by a lovesick female gorilla. Dr. Zabor takes a rifle and goes in pursuit.

Upon reaching the village, Sammy explains to Nona that the gorilla is really Duke and she embraces the gorilla, but just then Chula arrives with Dr. Zabor who aims the rifle at the gorilla. Sammy shields the gorilla with his body and is mortally wounded. As the gorilla kneels over Sammy and pats his face, the scene shifts to Duke shaking Sammy awake and, in answer to his questions, explaining that they are in the dressing room of The Jungle Hut nightclub in Passaic, New Jersey and "we're on next... come on!" In the hallway, Sammy sees Nona returning at the finish of her gorilla trainer act, with Chief Rakos in a gorilla suit, removing the gorilla head and complaining. He then meets Pepe Bordo who is now a waiter and runs into the tall Chula, wearing a tuxedo, who brusquely tells him, "Hurry it up... you're on next". Dr. Zabor is the manager who advises him, "You'd better get some laughs this time or you'll be collecting unemployment insurance". Finally, Saloma, a dancer in a Polynesian act, embraces Sammy, gives him a big kiss and, this time, he likes it as he and Duke perform their act with another rendition of "'Deed I Do".

Cast

Bela Lugosi as Dr. Zabor
Duke Mitchell as Duke Mitchell
Sammy Petrillo as Sammy Petrillo
Charlita as Nona
Muriel Landers as Saloma
Al Kikume as Chief Rakos
Mickey Simpson as Chula
Milton Newberger as Witch Doctor Bongo
Martin Garralaga as Pepe Bordo
Ramona, the Chimp
Steve Calvert as Gorilla (uncredited)
Ray Corrigan as Gorilla (uncredited)

Songs listed in opening credits
"'Deed I Do" by Walter Hirsch & Fred Rose
"Too Soon" by Nick Therry

Pre-production
During the 1950s, comedian Sammy Petrillo had established something of a career imitating comedian Jerry Lewis, who he closely resembled.
Petrillo worked for Lewis at one point after  an agent set up a meeting with Lewis who then cast him in a sketch on the NBC show The Colgate Comedy Hour. For $60, he played Jerry Lewis as a baby in a crib.  Petrillo went on to form a musical comedy team in the style of Martin and Lewis with singer Duke Mitchell. With Mitchell in the Dean Martin role and Petrillo as Jerry Lewis, the team played in various clubs in Las Vegas among other cities. Maurice Duke, who managed the duo, had pitched the idea of Petrillo and Mitchell starring in a movie to several studios. Duke eventually pitched the idea to Realart Pictures Inc. co-owner Jack Broder and his assistant, producer Herman Cohen. Duke then took Broder to see Petrillo and Mitchell perform in Culver City. While Broder thought the duo was hilarious, Herman Cohen (who saw the duo's act later) said he thought Petrillo and Mitchell "stunk". Bela Lugosi Meets a Brooklyn Gorilla was to be the first in a series of films starring Mitchell and Petrillo, but wound up as their only film together.

According to Herman Cohen, Jerry Lewis was furious when he heard that Sammy Petrillo and Duke Mitchell had formed a team that was imitative of his act with Dean Martin, and that they were to appear in a film together. Gary Lewis, Jerry's eldest son was quoted, "When Sammy and the other guy played in that gorilla movie, I remember my dad and Dean saying, ‘We got to sue these guys — this is no good.’" Lewis, who knew Jack Broder through the Friars Club of Beverly Hills, showed up at Jack Broder's office. The two got into a screaming match over the film and Lewis stormed out yelling obscenities. Paramount Pictures producer Hal B. Wallis, who then had Martin and Lewis under contract and also knew Broder through the Friars Club, threatened to sue Broder for releasing a film that featured a duo that closely resembled Martin and Lewis. Wallis and Broder later had a meeting after filming had completed and, according to Herman Cohen, Broder offered to sell Hal Wallis the negative to the film for a substantial amount of money. Wallis agreed to buy it so he could destroy it before anyone could see it but Broder and Wallis could not agree on price. Broder released the film and Wallis never spoke to Broder again.

Bela Lugosi was cast because Realart Pictures Inc., the company that produced the film, had reissued many of Lugosi's Universal horror films from the 1930s. By 1952, Lugosi's career had sharply declined and he hadn't worked in years. The film's associate producer Herman Cohen later recalled that Lugosi was quite ill at the time due to his addiction to morphine, but acted professionally and was nice. The film was originally to be titled White Woman of the Lost Jungle. The Gorilla title was thought up by Jack Broder's ten-year-old son. Associate producer Herman Cohen decided it would be foolish not to exploit Bela Lugosi's appearance in the film and decide to retitle the film using Lugosi's name.

Bela Lugosi Meets a Brooklyn Gorilla was filmed over a six-day period at the General Service Studios in Los Angeles. The film's budget was $12,000.

In his long-running Movie Guide, Leonard Maltin jokingly called it "one of the all-time greats."

Decades later, the film was referenced by Martin Landau, who watched it three times in preparation for his role as Lugosi in the biopic Ed Wood, saying that it was "so bad that it made Ed Wood's films look like Gone with the Wind."

See also
 List of films in the public domain in the United States

References

External links

 
 
 
  Sammy Petrillo Speaks Out; illustrated by Ward Sutton
 Interview with producer of Bela Lugosi Meets a Brooklyn Gorilla
 Joe Dante on Bela Lugosi Meets a Brooklyn Gorilla at Trailers From Hell

1952 films
1950s comedy horror films
1952 horror films
1950s science fiction comedy films
American adventure comedy films
American comedy horror films
American science fiction horror films
American black-and-white films
American science fiction comedy films
1950s English-language films
Films directed by William Beaudine
Films set on islands
Films set in Oceania
Films shot in Los Angeles
Jack Broder Productions Inc. films
American independent films
1950s adventure comedy films
1950s science fiction horror films
1952 comedy films
1950s independent films
Films about gorillas
1950s American films